Muzeum Mrtvol is a 1993 Czech text-based interactive fiction adventure game developed by Vladimír Peníška and Oldřich Křivánek of Computer Experts and published by Vochozka Trading. This genre, known in Czech as "Textovky" were abundant at the beginning of the local video gaming industry, and gradually developed into point and click adventures. The game was released at the same time as another text-based adventure Stíny noci.

References 

1993 video games
Adventure games
Interactive fiction
Vochozka Trading games